Yevhen Yuriyovych Isayenko (born 7 August 2000) is a Ukrainian professional footballer who plays as a striker for Kolos Kovalivka, on loan from Dynamo Kyiv.

Career
Isayenko is a product of the Vinnytsia and Dynamo Kyiv youth systems. His first trainer was Vitaliy Khmelnytskyi.

He made his debut in the Ukrainian Premier League for Dynamo on 13 April 2019 as a substitute against FC Mariupol.

Chornomorets Odesa
In July 2021 he moved on loan to Chornomorets Odesa.
On 25 July he made his league debut against Desna Chernihiv at the Chernihiv Stadium.

References

External links
 
 

2000 births
Living people
Footballers from Vinnytsia
Ukrainian footballers
FC Dynamo Kyiv players
FC Kolos Kovalivka players
FC Chornomorets Odesa players
Ukrainian Premier League players
Association football forwards
Ukraine youth international footballers
Ukraine under-21 international footballers